The Howard County Delegation refers to the delegates who are elected from legislative districts in or shared by Howard County, Maryland to serve in the Maryland House of Delegates. In each county's Senate and House Delegation, a chair is chosen from the party that has a majority within the delegation.

Authority and responsibilities
The Delegation is responsible for representing the interests, needs and concerns of the citizens of Howard County in the Maryland General Assembly. Former members include: Neil F. Quinter

Current members

See also
 Current members of the Maryland State Senate

References

External links
 Maryland General Assembly

Delegations in the Maryland General Assembly
Howard County, Maryland